Persicula danilai is a species of sea snail, a marine gastropod mollusk, in the family Cystiscidae.

Distribution
This marine species occurs off Equatorial Africa.

References

danilai
Gastropods described in 1992
Cystiscidae